Statement is the major label debut album by American rock band Nonpoint, and their third studio release overall. It was their first album released through MCA Records (now Geffen Records). 
The album debuted No. 166 on the Billboard 200 charts. The first single from the album, "What a Day", peaked at No. 24 on the Mainstream Rock charts.

Track listing

The song "Orgullo" translates to "Pride"; it's about Soriano and Rivera's Puerto Rican Heritage. It originally appeared on the band's 1996 demo Generate.

The song "Tribute" is a cover of sorts. It mashes up Children's Story by Slick Rick, Woo-Hah by Busta Rhymes, and Method Man by the Wu-Tang Clan. Guest vocals provided by Grimm of Darwin's Waiting Room.

Personnel 

Members
Elias Soriano - lead vocals
Robb Rivera - drums
Ken "K. Bastard" MacMillan - bass, backing vocals
Andrew Goldman - guitars, backing vocals

Production
Recorded and produced by Jason Bieler, at Elysian Studios, Boca Raton, Florida (on Pro Tools Mix Plus 24)
Engineered by Jason Bieler, Keith Rose, Chad Milosevich & Spidee Plaskon
Mixed by Tom Lord-Alge, at South Beach Studios, South Beach, Florida
Mastered by Bob Ludwig, at Gateway Mastering, Portland, Maine
Management by BVB Music Group
A&R by Hans Haedelt
Booking by Scott Sokol
Legal by Elliot Groffman
Photo by Matt Swig

References

Nonpoint albums
2000 albums
MCA Records albums